Lawrence is a small town 13 km from Maclean, New South Wales, Australia. It is accessed by the Lawrence car ferry from Woodford Island or by travelling 30 kilometres north from Grafton. At the 2016 census, the population of Lawrence was 1046. Lawrence has a number of sporting facilities including, a cricket field and soccer fields, a nine-hole golf course and tennis courts. Lawrence has a public school, a general store, post office, police station, Tavern and a local school and route bus service. It also has a museum (Lawrence Museum) housed in the old radio station building as well as very well preserved Public Hall of timber construction dating from 1892. The town is in the Clarence Valley Council local government area.

Archie Roach's brother was named after the town, and he writes about a visit to the town he made in 2013. He was able to reconnect with some of the history of his father's Bundjalung family, after he saw a huge photo of the family in the museum.

References

Towns in New South Wales
Northern Rivers
Clarence Valley Council